Dajyur or the Damxung Horse Festival is a Tibetan festival that takes place at the beginning of the eighth month of the lunar calendar (solar September) throughout southern Tibet. The festivities last for ten days with events such as horse racing, bicycle riding contests, and rock-carrying competitions contributing to a time of merriment and celebration.

Tibetan festivals
Religious festivals in Tibet
Equestrian festivals
Festivals in Tibet